Diego Pérez Villamuriel (died 1520) was a Roman Catholic prelate who served as Bishop of Mondoñedo (1512–1520).

Villamuriel was born in Spain. On 1 October 1512, he was appointed during the papacy of Pope Julius II as Bishop of Mondoñedo.
He served as Bishop of Mondoñedo until his death in 1520.

References 

16th-century Roman Catholic bishops in Spain
Bishops appointed by Pope Julius II
1520 deaths